Robertsganj is a Lok Sabha parliamentary constituency in Uttar Pradesh.

Assembly Segments

Members of Parliament

Election results

See also
 Robertsganj
 List of Constituencies of the Lok Sabha

External links
Robertsganj lok sabha  constituency election 2019 result details

Lok Sabha constituencies in Uttar Pradesh
Sonbhadra district